The 2019 Rugby World Cup was an international rugby union tournament which was held in Japan from 20 September until 2 November 2019. Twenty national teams competed, and each brought a 31-man squad containing no regulated number of players per-position to the tournament. The tournament was administered by World Rugby, to whom each team submitted their finalised squad by 8 September 2019. A player may be replaced for medical or compassionate reasons, but would be unable to return to the squad. Any replacement player has an enforced stand-down period of 48 hours before they can take the field.

Players marked (c) were named as captain for their national squad.

The age listed for each player is on 20 September 2019, the first day of the tournament. The numbers of caps for each player do not include any matches played after the start of tournament.

Overview
Below is a table listing all the head coaches and captains for each nation.

Pool A

Ireland
Ireland announced a 31-man squad for the tournament on 2 September 2019.

1 On 29 September, Jordi Murphy replaced Jack Conan, who suffered a foot injury in training.

2 On 16 October, Rob Herring replaced Seán Cronin following an injury.

Head coach:  Joe Schmidt

Japan
Japan named a 41-man training squad for the tournament on 15 August 2019, before confirming their final 31-man squad on 29 August.

Head coach:  Jamie Joseph

Russia
Russia named their 31-man squad for the tournament on 1 September.

Head coach:  Lyn Jones

Samoa
Samoa named a 34-man training squad for the tournament on 23 August 2019, before reducing it to a final 31 on 31 August.

1 On 9 September, Pele Cowley replaced Scott Malolua, who suffered a knee injury in Samoa's final warm-up match.

2 On 26 September, Alamanda Motuga joined the squad in Japan after Afa Amosa sustained an injury in Samoa's opening match.

Head coach:  Steve Jackson

Scotland
Scotland named an initial 42-man training squad on 7 May 2019. The final 31-man squad for the tournament was confirmed on 3 September.

1 On 23 September, Magnus Bradbury replaced Hamish Watson, after he suffered a knee injury in the team's opening match against Ireland.

2 On 24 September, Henry Pyrgos replaced Ali Price, after he suffered a foot injury in the team's opening match against Ireland.

Head coach:  Gregor Townsend

Pool B

Canada
Canada named a 42-man training squad for the tournament on 20 August 2019. The final 31-man squad was named on 3 September 2019.

1 On 10 September, Justin Blanchet was replaced by Josh Larsen in the World Cup squad following an injury sustained in Canada's final warm-up match.

2 On 27 September, injured centres Nick Blevins and Ben LeSage were replaced in the squad by Giuseppe du Toit and Theo Sauder.

3 On 3 October, Kainoa Lloyd joined the squad as an injury replacement for Taylor Paris.

Head coach:  Kingsley Jones

Italy
Italy named their 31-man squad for the tournament on 18 August 2019.

1 On 8 October, Giosuè Zilocchi and Danilo Fischetti joined the Italian squad following injuries to Simone Ferrari and Marco Riccioni.

Head coach:  Conor O'Shea

Namibia
Namibia named a 31-man squad for the tournament on 2 September.

Head coach:  Phil Davies

New Zealand
New Zealand named their 31-man squad on 28 August 2019.

1 On 13 September 2019, Shannon Frizell was named as replacement for Luke Jacobson, who was ruled out of the competition due to delayed onset of concussion.

Head coach:  Steve Hansen

South Africa
South Africa named their 31-man squad for the tournament on 26 August 2019.

1 On 23 September, Thomas du Toit replaced Trevor Nyakane, after he injured his calf in the team's opening match against New Zealand.

2 On 1 October, Damian Willemse replaced Jesse Kriel, after he was injured the team's opening match against New Zealand.

Head coach:  Rassie Erasmus

Pool C

Argentina
Argentina named their 31-man squad for the tournament on 19 August 2019.

1 On 6 October, Gonzalo Bertranou replaced Tomás Cubelli after he was injured in Argentina's game against England.

Head coach:  Mario Ledesma

England
On 12 August, England became the first team to announce their 31-man squad for the tournament.

1 Ben Spencer was called up on 27 October as an injury replacement for Willi Heinz.

Head coach:  Eddie Jones

France
On 18 June 2019, head coach Jacques Brunel named a 37-man squad for the 2019 Rugby World Cup warm-up matches. On 10 July 2019, Paul Willemse had to withdraw from the team due to injury; he was replaced by Romain Taofifénua. On 20 July 2019, Cyril Baille was called up to replace the injured Étienne Falgoux.

France named their final 31-man squad for the tournament on 2 September 2019.

1 On 22 September, Wesley Fofana withdrew from the squad due to injury, and was replaced by Pierre-Louis Barassi.

2 On 29 September, Cedate Gomes Sa was called up to replace the injured Demba Bamba.

3 On 4 October, Christopher Tolofua was called up to replace the injured Peato Mauvaka.

4 On 4 October, Vincent Rattez was called up to replace the injured Thomas Ramos.

Head coach:  Jacques Brunel

Tonga
Tonga announced their 31-man squad for the tournament on 1 September 2019.

1 On 24 September, Kurt Morath and Nafi Tuitavake were ruled out for the remainder of the tournament following injuries sustained in Tonga's opening match against England. Latiume Fosita and Fetuli Paea replaced them.

Head coach:  Toutai Kefu

United States
On 13 June, the United States named a 50-man extended training squad ahead of the 2019 World Rugby Pacific Nations Cup in preparation for the 2019 Rugby World Cup. On 19 June, Samu Manoa retired from international rugby and withdrew from the squad.

On 8 September, USA were the last side to name their 31-man squad.

1 On 1 October, David Ainu'u was ruled out for the remainder of the tournament following an injury sustained in the United States' opening match against England, Chance Wenglewski replaced him.

Head coach:  Gary Gold

Pool D

Australia
Australia named their 31-man squad for the tournament on 23 August 2019.

Head coach:  Michael Cheika

Fiji
Fiji named an initial 32-man squad for the tournament on 16 August 2019, before reducing it to the final 31 on 3 September.

1 On 5 September, prop Lee Roy Atalifo replaced Kalivati Tawake, who suffered a knee injury.

Head coach:  John McKee

Georgia
Georgia announced their 31-man squad for the tournament on 2 September 2019.

Head coach:  Milton Haig

Uruguay
Uruguay named their 31-man squad for the tournament on 30 August 2019.

Head coach:  Esteban Meneses

Wales
Wales announced their 31-man squad for the tournament on 1 September 2019.

1 On 24 September 2019 Cory Hill withdrew from the squad having failed to recover from injury and he was replaced by Bradley Davies.

2 On 22 October 2019 Josh Navidi withdrew from the squad having failed to recover from injury and he was replaced by Owen Lane.

Head coach:  Warren Gatland

Statistics
All statistics relate to the initial 31-man squads named prior to the start of the tournament on 20 September 2019 and do not include players who joined a squad during the tournament.

Five squads included no players based outside their home country: England, France, Ireland, Japan, and New Zealand.
The squads with the fewest players playing domestically are Tonga (zero) and Samoa (one).

Player representation by club
The 620 participating players, 20 players unattached, represent 144 different club sides, the club sides with the most players selected are below:

Players representation by league

* Namibia's Welwitschias most recently played in South Africa's 2019 Rugby Challenge but do not appear in a regular league as such.

Player representation by nation

Average age of squads

Squad caps

Previous World Cup experience

By matches

By tournaments

References

Squads
Rugby World Cup squads